Stomias boa ferox is a subspecies of deep-sea fish in the family Stomiidae.

Description
It has six rows of hexagonal areas above a lateral series of large photophores. The dorsal and anal fins are opposite each other, just anterior to the caudal fin. It can be distinguished from the S. boa boa subspecies by its larger number of photophores.

Name

The subspecies name ferox means "wild, ferocious." It is sometimes called dragon-boa, dragonfish or boa dragonfish, but those names are equally applied to Stomias boa as a species, or the S. boa boa subspecies. In Icelandic it is marsnákur ("sea snake") and in Norwegian storkjeft ("big jaw").

Distribution and habitat

Diet
Stomias boa ferox eats midwater fishes and crustaceans; it rises to near the surface to feed at night. It positions itself horizontally in the water column with pelvic and pectoral fins spread wide and barbel pointing forward.

Reproduction
Stomias boa ferox is oviparous.

References

Stomiidae
Fish described in 1842
Taxa named by Johan Reinhardt